Peter Greste (born 1 December 1965) is an Australian journalist and correspondent, who holds dual citizenship of Australia and Latvia. He has worked as a correspondent for Reuters, CNN and the BBC, predominantly in the Middle East, Latin America and Africa.

On 29 December 2013, Greste and two other Al Jazeera English journalists, Mohamed Fahmy and Baher Mohamed, were arrested by Egyptian authorities. On 23 June 2014, Greste was found guilty by the court, and sentenced to seven years of incarceration.

On 1 February 2015, a month after a retrial of Greste, Fahmy and Mohammad was announced, Greste was deported and flown to Cyprus. His colleagues were released on bail on 12 February 2015.

Early life
Greste's ancestry is Latvian. He was born in Sydney and has two younger brothers. He is a dual citizen of Australia and Latvia. He attended Indooroopilly State High School where he was school captain. He graduated in journalism studies from the Queensland University of Technology in Brisbane.

Early career 

From 1991 to 1995, Greste was based in London, Bosnia and South Africa, where he worked for Reuters, CNN, WTN and the BBC. In 1995, he was based in Kabul, Afghanistan, where he was a correspondent for the BBC and Reuters, after which he was based in Belgrade for a year, where he was a correspondent for Reuters. He then returned to London, where he worked for BBC News 24. He was then based in Mexico, then Santiago, as a correspondent for the BBC. He returned to Afghanistan in 2001 to cover the start of the war. After Afghanistan, he worked across the Middle East and Latin America. From 2004, he was based in Mombasa, Kenya, then Johannesburg, South Africa, followed by six years in Nairobi, Kenya.  In 2011, he won a Peabody Award for a BBC documentary on Somalia. That year, he left the BBC to become a correspondent for Al Jazeera English in Africa.

Egyptian trial and imprisonment

Greste was arrested in Cairo with colleagues at the end of December 2013. The interior ministry said the journalists were accused of news reporting which was "damaging to national security". Greste was imprisoned in Egypt in solitary confinement for a month before any formal charges were made. On 29 January, it emerged that the Egyptian authorities were to charge 20 Al Jazeera journalists, including Greste, of falsifying news and having a negative impact on overseas perceptions of the country. His colleagues, Mohamed Fadel Fahmy and Baher Mohamed, were also imprisoned; the three men were being held in the same cell in early February 2014. The United Nations High Commissioner for Human Rights urged the authorities in Egypt to "promptly release" the Al Jazeera staff they were holding in custody.

On 21 February, Greste was refused bail and had his court case adjourned until 5 March.

On 31 March, he and co-defendants Mohammed Fahmy and Baher Mohamed made a request to a judge during a hearing to be released. During the hearing Greste told the judge: "The idea that I could have an association with the Muslim Brotherhood is frankly preposterous."

On 23 June, Greste was found guilty by the court, and sentenced to seven years in prison. Mohammed Fahmy also received seven years and Baher Mohamed received a sentence of ten years in prison. International reaction was swift and negative. US Secretary of State John Kerry was highly critical of the sentences of Greste and his co-workers, terming them "chilling and draconian" and noted he had spoken to Egyptian governmental officials including President Abdul Fattah al-Sisi. Al-Sisi however was unmoved. A day after the trial, and amidst the widespread international condemnation, the Egyptian president declared that he would not interfere with judicial rulings.

Greste and his colleagues were seen internationally as political prisoners due to the nature of the trial, the lack of applicable evidence presented and the sentences.

On 1 January 2015 the Court of Cassation announced a retrial for Greste and his colleagues. Release on bail was not permitted. On 1 February, Greste was deported to Australia. The Egyptian law allowing the deportation of foreigners stipulates that they face prison or trial in their home country, but Australia is not likely to uphold Greste's conviction. Otherwise, no explanation was given for his release.

On 29 August 2015, an Egyptian court sentenced Peter Greste and his colleagues to another three years in prison, with Baher Mohamed being sentenced to an additional six months. Greste will avoid imprisonment because he was deported to Australia in February.  He was tried in absentia. Less than a month later, on 23 September 2015, Mohamed Fahmy and Baher Mohamed were pardoned by Egyptian president Abdel Fatah al-Sisi. Greste received the news of his colleagues' release while filming a segment for the ABC Television show The Chaser's Media Circus, which is filmed in front of a live studio audience, and his reaction was caught on camera. The episode was aired the following day. Host of the show Craig Reucassel did a disclaimer at the beginning of the episode, saying that because it was filmed previous to the revelation of the pardon, the show made no acknowledgement of it until the end.

Later career 
He returned to Australia in February 2016 to work as a freelance journalist, speaker and press freedom advocate. He presented a two-part TV documentary miniseries on Sir John Monash, Monash and Me, which was aired in Australia in 2018. In February 2018, he took up a position at the University of Queensland as "UNESCO Chair in Journalism and Communications". Along with lawyer Chris Flynn and journalist Peter Wilkinson, Greste founded the Alliance for Journalists' Freedom.

In 2017, Greste wrote and directed Facebook: Cracking the Code, a documentary for Four Corners (Australian TV program), presented by Sarah Ferguson (journalist).

In 2021, the State Library of Queensland commissioned an interview with Greste containing an oral history of his life, career and imprisonment.

Awards
On 19 February 2015, Greste, Fahmy and Mohamed won a special Royal Television Society award for their sacrifices to journalism. Greste accepted the award in London for the three.

Greste has advocated widely for freedom of the press and free speech. In recognition of his efforts, he was awarded the 2015 Australian Human Rights Medal.

Books
In 2016, Penguin Books published Freeing Peter, by Andrew Greste, a biographical account of his family's efforts to free him from incarceration.

In 2017, Greste's own book The First Casualty was published by Penguin Books. It reportedly contains a "first-hand account of how the war on journalism has spread from the battlefields of the Middle East to the governments of the West". In this book Gresete shows how this war on journalism has spread to the West, not just in the murders at the French satirical magazine Charlie Hebdo or the repressions of Putin's Russia, but Australia's metadata laws and Trump's phony war on 'fake news.

It was shortlisted for the 2018 Walkley Book Award.

See also
 Mohamed Fahmy

References

External links
 Al Jazeera Profile
 
 
 Inga Spriņģe : Pēteris Greste (ENG). 6 May 2015. Latvian Television.
 Peter Greste in Conversation State Library Of Queensland

1965 births
Living people
Australian reporters and correspondents
Australian people of Latvian descent
Prisoners and detainees of Egypt
Journalists from Sydney
Latvian journalists
Peabody Award winners
Australian people imprisoned abroad
Imprisoned journalists
People deported from Egypt
Queensland University of Technology alumni